Palestinian Authority Governments of June and July 2007" is a conciliation pact between Hamas and Fatah in the Palestinian Authority This agreement convened a council (PA) of emergency cabinets led by Salam Fayyad established by the Palestinian President Mahmoud Abbas by presidential decree. The first Fayyad government was formed on June 14, 2007. Although widely supported by the international community, its creation is controversial as it was established under the Basic Law which requires the approval of the new government by Palestinian Legislative Council. President Abbas has enacted some articles of the Basic Law to allow cabinets to be sworn in with the approval of the PLC.

Emergency rule replaced the short-lived Hamas government  National Unity Government 2007, which was dismissed by President Abbas after Hamas takeover of Gaza in June 2007

The Fayyad government was swiftly recognized by the international community as the legal government of the Palestinian Authority. Fayyad remained the Prime Minister of the Ramallah-based West Bank Governments, until he was replaced by Rami Hamdallah, who became Prime Minister of the Palestinian Authority Government of June 2013.

Controversy 
By presidential decree, President Abbas declared a state of emergency in June 2007, and dismissed Haniyeh-led 2007 National Unity Government, which included Abbas' Fatah faction and several other parties. Then, he appointed an emergency cabinet and suspended articles of the Basic Law, to circumvent the needed PLC approval.

Senior lawyers who wrote the Basic Law said that President Abbas exceeded his powers in appointing an emergency government to replace a Hamas-led cabinet without PLC approval. Although he had the power to dismiss Haniyeh as Prime Minister, the law did not grant him the power to appoint a new government without PLC approval nor the right to suspend articles of the Basic Law. Haniyeh's dismissed cabinet should have remained as caretaker administration until Abbas secured PLC approval for a new government. Moreover, a Presidential decree lasts 30 days, only extendable with PLC approval. Nathan Brown said: "These are absolutely and clearly black and white violations. He has no authority whatsoever to appoint an emergency government."

Timeline 
On 14 June 2007, President Abbas declared a state of emergency, dismissed the Hamas-led national unity PA government and Salam Fayyad was commissioned to form a caretaker government. Fayyad's 16-member emergency government (described as the 12th government) was installed on the same day. Only two members of the previous government, Fayyad himself and Khouloud Daibes, kept their portfolios in the new government.

The Fayyad government was immediately recognized by the international community as the legal Palestinian Authority government, The international community had boycotted the previous Hamas-led governments, and diverted international aid directly to Abbas or humanitarian aid organizations. Yet, they were prepared to work with the new PA Government.

According to a Human Rights Watch report, the Government ordered a boycott of the security, judicial and other government sectors in Gaza and ordered its employees to stay home from work if they wanted to get paid. President Abbas and Fatah supported Israel's Gaza border closures and restrictions on the supply of electricity and fuel. According to Palestinian security officials in the West Bank, Israel had since June 2007 assisted them in their common fight against Hamas. The cooperation with Israel generated a common view among Palestinians in the West Bank, that the forces under President Abbas are the “subcontractor of the occupation“. The Human Rights Watch report furthermore states that serious human rights abuses were committed by the new government, but also by the Hamas government in Gaza.

On 13 July 2007, the state of emergency expired in accordance with the Basic Law, and President Abbas issued a new decree to continue the state of emergency. The Fayyad government continued functioning as a caretaker government. 

On 22 July 2007, Prime Minister Fayyad presented his government (described as the 13th government) for PLC approval. Fayyad also presented his government's principles and goals, and emphasized that his government would be based on inter alia the Arab Peace Initiative and ″all pertinent international resolutions″, and that the government would honour the agreements made with Israel. The second Fayyad government was identical to the first Fayyad government of 14 June.
 However, as the PLC quorum requirement could not be met, as Hamas members were boycotting the PLC, the approval was given in “extraordinary” session.

Members of the Government 

June to July 2007

See also
Palestinian government
Hamas government of June 2007

References

Palestinian National Authority governments
Cabinets disestablished in 2009
Cabinets established in 2007
2007 establishments in the Palestinian territories
2009 disestablishments in the Palestinian territories